Roberto Domínguez Castellanos (born 15 April 1954) is a Mexican politician from the Institutional Revolutionary Party. From 2000 to 2003 he served as Deputy of the LVIII Legislature of the Mexican Congress representing Chiapas.

References

1954 births
Living people
Politicians from Chiapas
Institutional Revolutionary Party politicians
21st-century Mexican politicians
People from Venustiano Carranza, Chiapas
Chapingo Autonomous University alumni
Academic staff of the Chapingo Autonomous University
Deputies of the LVIII Legislature of Mexico
Members of the Chamber of Deputies (Mexico) for Chiapas